Csaba Hirbik (born 29 December 1976) is a Hungarian wrestler. He competed in the men's Greco-Roman 69 kg at the 2000 Summer Olympics.

References

External links
 
 Csaba Hirbik / finalist / World Championship, 1998, Sweden

1976 births
Living people
Hungarian male sport wrestlers
Olympic wrestlers of Hungary
Wrestlers at the 2000 Summer Olympics
Martial artists from Budapest